2010 Thespa Kusatsu season

Competitions

Player statistics

Other pages
 J. League official site

Thespa Kusatsu
Thespakusatsu Gunma seasons